The Communist Party of Denmark/Marxist–Leninists (DKP/ML) was a political party in Denmark, that advocated revolutionary communism.

History 
The DKP/ML was founded in 1978. The DKP/ML took part in elections in 1984 and 1987, under the party letter L, but got less than 1,000 votes in each election.

After it was founded, the DKP/ML took a stand with Enver Hoxha's Albania and the Albanian Party of Labor granted it official recognition. After the dissolution of socialism in Albania, they concluded that communists should get over sectarianism and unite into one party. They have tried this since, so far culminating in the November 2006 merger with Kommunistisk Samling, into Kommunistisk Parti (KP). The merger marked the abolition of DKP/ML as a party.

The DKP/ML published, and the KP still publishes, the daily Arbejderen newspaper.

It also published Partiets Vej, a quarterly.

Folketing election results

References

1978 establishments in Denmark
2006 disestablishments in Denmark
Anti-revisionist organizations
Defunct communist parties in Denmark
Political parties established in 1978
Political parties disestablished in 2006